The gabbang, also known as bamboo xylophone, is a musical instrument made of bamboo widely used in southern Philippines. Among the Tausugs and Samas, it is commonly played to accompany songs and dances as a solo instrument or accompanied by the biola.

Physical features
A gabbang consists of a set of trapezoidal bamboo bars of increasing length resting on a resonator. The number of bars varies with the group that made them: Among Yakans, the number ranges from three to nine bamboo bars, but the common agung gabbang has five; among Tausugs, the number ranges from 14 to 22 bamboo bars, but the common gabbang has 12; and in Palawan, the common gabbang has five.

Playing techniques
A bamboo xylophone is played by direct striking using a wooden mallet. The gabbang is played by a pair of beaters while another taps a rhythmic pattern on the side of the box.

See also
 Bungkaka
 Diwas
 Kolitong
 Paldong
 Takumbo

References

Philippine musical instruments
Bamboo musical instruments
Idiophones struck directly